, was a hexagonal wooden retreat overlooking the sea along the Izura coast in Kitaibaraki, Ibaraki Prefecture, Japan. Dating to 1905, it was part of the Izura Institute of Arts & Culture, Ibaraki University. Constructed in the sukiya-zukuri style, single-storey, with a tiled roof, an area of nine square metres, and painted red, it was designed by scholar and critic Okakura Tenshin who spent time there with painter Yokoyama Taikan. In 2003 it was added to the Tangible Cultural Properties Register. On 11 March 2011 it was swept off to sea in the tsunami. It was rebuilt and opened to the public in April 2012.

See also
 Tenshin Memorial Museum of Art, Ibaraki
 Nihon Bijutsuin
 Registered Cultural Properties
 Kanrantei
 Japanese aesthetics

References

Further reading

Buildings and structures in Ibaraki Prefecture
Buildings of the Meiji period
History of art in Japan
Registered Tangible Cultural Properties
Kitaibaraki, Ibaraki